is a fictional character in the Final Fantasy role-playing video game series by Square Enix (originally Square), first introduced as a non-player character in Final Fantasy VII (1997). Zack later appears in the Compilation of Final Fantasy VII works Before Crisis, Last Order, Advent Children and, most prominently, Crisis Core, a prequel to the original game of which he is the main character, and which expands greatly on his backstory.

Although Zack is already dead at the start of Final Fantasy VII, is rarely mentioned and only appears late into the story via flashbacks, he is a crucial part of the game's story, as Cloud Strife, the main character, unknowingly confused parts of his own past with Zack's following traumatic events involving the two and Sephiroth; while Cloud originally believes himself to be a member of the paramilitary organization SOLDIER, the military wing of the megacorporation Shinra, that story was in fact that of Zack, with Cloud being his friend and a regular soldier. Zack died in the weeks leading up to the opening of Final Fantasy VII, to protect Cloud from Shinra's army after they had escaped from imprisonment; a mentally shaken Cloud's memories of the events were heavily affected, and he forgot Zack entirely.

Zack was not originally a part of Final Fantasy VIIs story during development, but scenario writer Kazushige Nojima wanted to bring a sense of mystery to the title, and created the character to help complicate Cloud's backstory. He was designed by Tetsuya Nomura, and his last name is derived from "fair weather", to contrast with Cloud's last name, Strife. With Zack's conceptual backstory in place for Final Fantasy VII, the staff decided to use Compilation of Final Fantasy VII to expand upon his character. Zack is voiced by Kenichi Suzumura in Japanese and Rick Gomez in English works prior to Final Fantasy VII Remake, in which he is voiced by Caleb Pierce. Suzumura was chosen specifically by Nomura for his voice, and was given the role without an audition. Western critics have praised Zack's character, commenting on his development since Final Fantasy VII.

Concept and creation
Zack did not exist in the original scenario of Final Fantasy VII, but was created only when scenario writer Kazushige Nojima decided to add some mystery to the plot, most notably in relation to Cloud Strife's background. Nojima had always planned for Cloud Strife's memories of his life to be proven false as the game went on, but he had not decided on how to implement this until he hit on the character of Zack. Nojima also used Zack to link Cloud and Aerith Gainsborough, as Aerith had seen something of Zack in Cloud. Zack was the first person Aerith loved, thus creating an emotional connection between herself and Cloud, because he reminds her of him. Originally, the role of her first love was to have been fulfilled by the game's antagonist Sephiroth. As the game continued in its development, Nojima worked out the mysteries regarding Zack and Cloud, which led to some of the scenes in the game needing revision. Director Yoshinori Kitase was surprised by the revelation of Cloud's and Zack's connection, as until the later stages of development, even he did not know about Zack. Character designer Tetsuya Nomura got the request to design Zack when Final Fantasy VII was reaching the end of development. Prior to the late addition of Zack, Nojima had asked the staff to add details to some scenes so as to give clues about him, despite the fact that he did not reveal to the staff Zack's existence until later. Although Zack is linked with Cloud due to multiple parallls, his personality was based on Final Fantasy X protagonist Tidus as both are rarely bothered by their own thoughts and are generally cheerful when compared with Cloud according to Nojima.

For Final Fantasy VII: Advent Children, Zack made only a couple of brief appearances, and as such, was not difficult to animate; the team had also acquired his design early in production, allowing modeling of his character to be taken care of. Nomura had wanted Zack to have a "nice, upbeat voice", which influenced his decision to cast Kenichi Suzumura. Beforehand, Nomura had had dinner with Suzumura, where he had decided that "at that point [Nomura] wanted him to be in one of his projects if the opportunity ever presented itself". Suzumura was offered the role without an audition. Nomura explained that, because Zack had been chosen to be the lead in Last Order: Final Fantasy VII, he needed "someone who could handle [the] role well". The staff used Last Order as an opportunity to portray Zack "properly" as a "handsome, light-hearted man [who] was in everyone's memory". In English, Zack is voiced by Rick Gomez.

In an interview with IGN whilst promoting Crisis Core, Yoshinori Kitase explained that when the original game was created, Zack was a minor character, although Nomura had created art design, and Nojima had created a basic concept of Zack's story. Kitase further explained that "you could say that the idea [for the storyline of Crisis Core] has been cooking for 10 years". Before Crisis Core began development, the staff had planned to create a PlayStation Portable port of Before Crisis: Final Fantasy VII, but soon changed their minds to create a game that focused on Zack, whose fate was already predetermined; fans knew how the game was going to end. Throughout the game, the staff decided to use a blue sky in cutscenes to represent Zack, while other features in such scenes are meant to symbolize his connections. A number of Zack's actions from the game were also designed so as to augment the similarities that Aerith finds between him and Cloud in Final Fantasy VII.

Due to Zack initially appearing as a younger person than the one seen in previous games, Suzumura was asked to portray Zack in a fashion that shows him naive in order for his character arc being more noticeable as Zack becomes more mature in the narrative of Crisis Core. He wears the SOLDIER 1st class uniform, consisting of a black, sleeveless turtleneck, black boots, and armor. In Crisis Core, Zack has two attires; his Final Fantasy VII outfit and a different outfit worn during the start of the game, which he changes after fighting Angeal Hewley. Originally, Zack was meant to wear red clothing until Tetsuya Nomura drew his black outfit. He was made as a conventional heroic character in contrast to Cloud who was written as an unlikely hero. There was an attempt to make Zack's and Aerith's interactions appealing in Crisis Core. Zack's full name was first revealed in an article in Dengeki PlayStation. Nomura stated that Zack's name was derived from 'fair weather' and specifically chosen because it contrasted with Cloud Strife's name. Zack and Cloud's connection was also meant to be expanded upon near the game's ending, with both of them planning to flee to Midgar. However, due to limitations in the console's hardware, these scenes could not be implemented, and instead, they decided to focus on Zack's role as a warrior.

Appearances
Zack had only a small role in the original Final Fantasy VII. He is first mentioned by name in Gongaga, his hometown, where his parents are oblivious as to what became of him after he left to join SOLDIER, and are worried for his safety after not hearing from him for years. It is at this point that Aerith explains Zack was her first love. Cloud later realizes that some of his memories and even aspects of his personality were actually Zack's, and not his own. Flashbacks reveal that both Zack and Cloud battled Sephiroth after he burned the town of Nibelheim upon discovering he was the result of a scientific experiment. After Cloud defeated Sephiroth, both Zack and Cloud were taken to be used in experiments by Shinra. Eventually, Zack woke up and was able to escape with a semi-conscious Cloud to the city Midgar, but on the edge of the city, he was gunned down by Shinra troops. While Zack's and Cloud's flashback escape is optional in the North American and European releases of Final Fantasy VII and the Japanese International version, it was originally planned to be shown once Cloud discovered the results of Shinra's experiments.

Zack's character and backstory is expanded upon throughout the Compilation of Final Fantasy VII. In the prequel game Before Crisis, Zack supports Shinra in their fight against the eco-terrorist group AVALANCHE. During the game, two of his SOLDIER acquaintances are captured and experimented upon, and though Zack is able to bring them back to their senses, he is unable to save them. Zack also makes an appearance during the chapter covering the Nibelheim incident, and later as a boss character when he and Cloud are fugitives from Shinra and are being pursued by the Turks. The OVA Last Order: Final Fantasy VII follows Zack and Cloud's journey to Midgar with flashbacks of the Nibelheim incident. Zack also has a small role in the film sequel Advent Children, where most of his appearances are flashbacks from Cloud's point of view. He also appears at the end of the film, where he and the now deceased Aerith speak to Cloud. In the director's cut version, Advent Children Complete, his role is expanded, and he makes an appearance during Cloud's battle with Sephiroth. His death is also shown in the film, where he gives Cloud the Buster Sword and tells him to become his "living legacy".

Zack is the protagonist of Crisis Core, a prequel to Final Fantasy VII, which deals primarily with Zack's backstory. In the game, Zack is trained as a SOLDIER by his close friend, Angeal Hewley, and hopes to become a hero while working for Shinra. When Angeal, and another SOLDIER, Genesis Rhapsodos, betray Shinra, Zack and Sephiroth are dispatched to kill them, but they decide to avoid doing that if possible. He and Sephiroth learn that both Angeal and Genesis were the result of a Shinra experiment called "Project G", where they were injected with Jenova cells prior to being born in an effort to create perfect SOLDIERs. However, both Angeal and Genesis are suffering from secondary effects which led them to antagonize Shinra in the hopes of finding a cure. In the course of the game, Zack befriends Cloud and begins dating Aerith. During a mission to find Angeal and Genesis, Angeal forces Zack to kill him, as he wants to stop hurting people because of his mutations. Before dying, Angeal thanks Zack for stopping him and gives him his Buster Sword. Later, while Zack and Sephiroth search for Genesis and the former Shinra scientist Dr. Hollander, they go to Nibelheim where Sephiroth learns that he too was the result of genetic experimentation involving Jenova. The game then depicts the Nibelheim incident, leading to Zack and Cloud being taken captive and subjected to experiments themselves. Four years pass, Zack and Cloud are able to escape, and Zack learns that Genesis has come to believe the only way he can be cured is by being injected with Sephiroth's cells. As Sephiroth is thought dead, the only source of these cells is now Cloud, and Zack realises that Genesis plans to kill Cloud. Zack decides to stop Genesis, and after defeating him, he and Cloud head to Midgar, where he hopes to be reunited with Aerith. However, Zack and Cloud are intercepted by Shinra infantry, and Zack is killed. In his dying breath, Zack gives the Buster Sword to Cloud, telling him to be his living legacy. As Cloud stumbles off towards Midgar, Zack is pulled into the sky by Angeal, and wonders if he has become a hero.

Zack has served as the basis for several forms of merchandise, such as being pictured on the Final Fantasy VII 10th Anniversary Potion soft drink cans. Outside the Final Fantasy VII series, Zack is an unlockable character in the PlayStation version of the fighting game Ehrgeiz, where is playable in arcade, versus, and minigame events. He made his debut appearance in the Kingdom Hearts series in the prequel Birth by Sleep for the PlayStation Portable, where he has a more youthful appearance than in his Final Fantasy incarnation. He is featured prominently in the Olympus Coliseum, commonly participating in tournaments in order to achieve his dream of becoming a hero. As the game is a prequel to the other Kingdom Hearts titles, the staff chose him as they wanted a character from a Final Fantasy prequel.

Zack appears at the end of Final Fantasy VII Remake during a flashback scene, where he survives the ambush by Shinra forces and continues dragging Cloud toward Midgar. It is implied that the scene takes place in another timeline from the main narrative.

Reception

Popularity
Critical response to Zack's character has generally been positive. In IGNs 2008 list of Final Fantasy VII top ten characters list, Zack made sixth place, with IGN's Dave Smith noting that "his check-out scene in Crisis Core is just about as epic as it gets in videogames". In 2010, Famitsu readers voted Zack the 37th most popular video game character in Japan. GamesRadars Jim Sterling found Zack to be one of video game's most sexually appealing male characters due to his personality and look. In 2013, Complex ranked Zack as the 18th greatest Final Fantasy character of all time, as well as the sixth greatest soldier in video games. In a survey, Zack was voted the 16th best character voiced by Suzumura.

Critical response

Zack's role in Crisis Core has received a mainly positive reaction. IGNs Ryan Clements particularly praised Zack's relationships with the other main characters. 1UP.coms Jeremy Parish agreed with Clements, arguing that Zack's story contrasted with other RPG plots, calling it "the heart of the game". Kevin VanOrd from GameSpot labelled Zack a "likable and complex hero", arguing that he "transcends the usual spiky-haired heroism and teenage angst with an uncommon maturity that develops as the game continues". GameSpys Gerald Villoria described Zack as "King of the Nice Guys", noting that even though he can be a "pretty hate-worthy character if you're the jaded type who mocks the typical Final Fantasy storyline", players who dislike him could come to appreciate him. Zack was also called an "endearing main character" by GameRevolution who stated that despite what the character goes through during the game, he still retains his friendly attitude. Like other reviewers, RPGamer viewed him to have the "full, soulful carriage of a Final Fantasy hero" due to his personal conflicts, despite his "artfully teased hair and devil-may-care grin". Although Eurogamers Simon Parkin found Zack's physical appearance to be highly similar to Cloud's, he added that "this fan service doesn't put a foot wrong until he reaches into his [Zack's] pocket, pulls out a mobile phone and speaks". GamesRadars AJ Glasser commented that the way Zack obtains the Buster Sword and the way he gives it to Cloud is the "ultimate payoff" of Crisis Core, stating that the fact gamers know how the game will end is a serious detraction. When Ayaka finished the song "Why" for Crisis Core, she mentioned that she wanted to deliver it alongside Zack's fate "to the hearts of many people". IGN UKs Dave McCarthy noted how Zack's role in the Compilation of Final Fantasy VII evolved as the series developed, to the point of him getting his own game. Because Zack survives to the events of Crisis Core in the events of Remake, Meristation looks forward to his role in Rebirth and his link with the Cloud the player controls.

On the other hand, PSXextremes Ben Dutka, felt that Zack was not worthy of his own game, believing that only players with "halfway decent memories" and a "hardcore completionist mentality" will be able to remember Zack's appearances in the original Final Fantasy VII. IGN UK expressed a mixed opinion about the character, feeling his personality was sometimes annoying, although it served to contrast with the serious attitudes of the other main characters. Similarly, VideoGamer.coms Wesley Yin-Poole called Zack Cloud's "identical twin in all but hair colour" and complained about his personality being "annoying" during the first half of the game. Destructoid agreed, telling players not to expect to enjoy Zack if they do not like "cocky teenagers" and even labelling him an "annoying cockhole". PALGN called Zack an unfamiliar character in the series since his only appearances were in backstories.

There was also commentary about Zack's actors. Eurogamer praised Zack's English voice actor for doing a good job, noting "his character's maturing and developing over the 15-hour storyline". IGN AUs Patrick Kolan agreed, calling Rick Gomez's work "pretty likeable".Gameplanet criticized Rick Gomez' acting, finding it more immature than they expected. Caleb Pierce's work as the character in Reunion resulted in several complaints from reviewers due to lacking Gomez's appeal, making the character come across as untolerable due to lacking heroic and energetic tone from Gomez. The criticism from fans in regards to Pierce's performance as Zack resulted in websites noting that mods were created for the game to restore the original voice actors.

See also
 List of Final Fantasy VII characters

Notes

References

External links

Characters designed by Tetsuya Nomura
Final Fantasy VII characters
Fictional murdered people
Fictional defectors
Fictional private military members
Fictional soldiers in video games
Fictional super soldiers
Fictional swordfighters in video games
Genetically engineered characters in video games
Male characters in video games
Science fantasy video game characters
Square Enix protagonists
Video game bosses
Video game characters introduced in 1997